was the fourth son of the Japanese regent Fujiwara no Tadamichi, and Kaga, daughter of Fujiwara no Nakamitsu. His brothers were Motozane (regent), Motofusa (regent), Kanezane (regent), and Jien. He lacked political capability, but he eventually became Daijō Daijin after his brother Kanezane.

Family 
Parents
Father: Fujiwara no Tadamichi (藤原 忠通, March 15, 1097 – March 13, 1164)
Mother: Kaga no Tsubone (加賀局), daughter of Fujuwara no Kanemitsu（藤原仲光）
Consorts and issue
Wife: Daughter of Fujiwara no Takasue (藤原隆季)
Son: Kujo Kaneyoshi (九条兼良, 1167 – 27 January 1221)
Wife: Daughter of Fujiwara no Tsunemune (藤原 経宗)
Unknown
Son: Dōyō (道誉)
Son: Ken'en (兼円)
Son: Dōyū (道祐)
Daughter: Lady Hōjō (方丈殿)

1153 births
1217 deaths
Fujiwara clan